Moskva was the first of her class of helicopter carriers in service with the Soviet Navy. Laid down at Nikolayev South (Shipyard No.444), Moskva was launched in 1965 and she was commissioned two years later. Both were conventionally powered.

The Moskvas were not true "aircraft carriers" in that they did not carry any fixed-wing aircraft; the air wing was composed entirely of helicopters. They were designed primarily as anti-submarine warfare (ASW) vessels, and her weapons and sensor suite was optimized against the nuclear submarine threat. Shipboard ASW armament included a twin SUW-N-1 launcher capable of delivering a FRAS-1 projectile carrying a 450 mm torpedo (or a 5 kiloton nuclear warhead); a pair of RBU-6000 ASW mortars; and a set of torpedo tubes. For self-defense, the Moskvas had two twin SA-N-3 SAM launchers with reloads for a total of 48 surface-to-air missiles, along with two twin 57 mm/80 guns. A "Mare Tail" variable depth sonar worked in conjunction with heliborne sensors to hunt submarines.

Their strategic role was to defend the Soviet ballistic missile submarine bastions against incursions by Western attack submarines, forming the flagships of an ASW task force.

On 2 February 1975, a fire in the ship's bow caused severe damage. She was out of action for a year whilst repairs were made. Leningrad was taken out of service in 1991, but Moskva remained in service until the late 1990s, when she, too, was scrapped.

Notes and references

References
Project 1123 Kondor - Moskva class
 Moskva class

External links

Moskva-class helicopter carriers
1965 ships
Aircraft carriers of the Russian Navy
Ships built at the Black Sea Shipyard
Ships built in the Soviet Union
Maritime incidents in 1975